The Classical Academy (TCA) is a kindergarten through twelfth grade public charter school located in northern Colorado Springs, Colorado, United States. It is chartered through Academy School District 20.

The school is known for having an extensive waiting list, with over 5,400 students on the current waiting list for all grades combined.

Rankings
The Classical Academy High School is ranked 10th within Colorado by U.S. News & World Report and #368 nationally.

Awards
In 2012, 2013, and 2014 the Colorado Department of Education awarded every TCA (elementary, junior high, and high school) as well as College Pathways the John Irwin Award for Academic Excellence. The John Irwin awards are given to schools that demonstrate excellent academic achievement.

Campuses
The Classical Academy currently has three campuses in Northern Colorado Springs:

North Campus  
The Classical Academy High School, The Classical Academy Junior High School and The Classical Academy North Elementary are located at 975 Stout Road. The North Campus is considered the main campus and is the location of the school administration offices.

Central Campus 
The Classical Academy Central Elementary is located at 1655 Springcrest Road.  This facility, formerly known as Mountain View School, was purchased by the TCA Building Corporation in 2004 for $1.9 million. Monthly payments will continue until November 1, 2019 when the note is paid in full.

East Campus 
The Classical Academy East Elementary is located at 12201 Cross Peak View (just west of Pikes Peak State College, Rampart Range Campus).

East Campus is also the location of the school's homeschool programs:
 The Cottage School Program for kindergarten through eighth grade. 
 TCA College Pathways for seventh through twelfth grades. Students apart of this program also attend the adjacent Pikes Peak State College Rampart Range Campus.

School uniforms 
The school has a uniform policy for all grade levels.

Admission and enrollment 
The Classical Academy does not have open enrollment for students, nor is it an Academy School District 20 Choice option.  The Classical Academy is a wait list school. Students are offered seats and admitted to the school based on their wait list position.  Parents can apply from any of the surrounding fifteen school districts in and around Colorado Springs. Priority is given to students of administration, faculty, current enrolled siblings, and residents of Academy School District 20.

Board of directors
The Classical Academy is governed by a seven-member Board that is elected by the parents of students. The Board members volunteer their time and serve without compensation. Board members are elected through ballot for a three-year maximum term.

Athletics and activities

Athletics 
High School sports include Baseball, Cross Country, football, Men’s Basketball, Men’s Golf, Men’s Soccer, Softball, Spirit/Cheer, Track, Volleyball, Women’s Basketball, Women’s Golf, Women’s Soccer, and Wrestling.

Junior High sports include Boys’ Basketball, Cross Country, football, Girls’ Basketball, Softball, Track, Volleyball, and Wrestling.

All of the main sports compete in Colorado's 3A athletic conference, except cross country, which competes at the 4A level as of 2012.

Performing arts 
The Classical Academy Marching Band has won the CBA state championship in the 2A class twice, in 2017 and 2018.

Chess 
The Classical Academy chess team has won the CSCA state 4A championship title three times, in 2010, 2011 and 2012.

Criticisms 
Current and previous parents have noted the heavier workload on the students, in addition to the “militaristic” atmosphere, as negative and not fostering a nurturing school environment. Other parents have rebutted this.

In 2009, the school was reported to the Colorado Department of Education for possible conflicts of interest with administrators who run a charter-school consulting business on the side and said the school failed to properly respond to allegations of sexual and physical assaults and bullying. Then TCA President Mark Hyatt said he welcomed the scrutiny and new guidelines and additional training was being put in place.

See also 
 Colorado Springs Christian Schools
 The Vanguard School (Colorado)

References

High schools in Colorado Springs, Colorado
Public high schools in Colorado
Public middle schools in Colorado
Public elementary schools in Colorado
Charter schools in Colorado
1997 establishments in Colorado
Educational institutions established in 1997